Dornelas is a parish in Amares Municipality in the Braga District in Portugal. The population in 2011 was 508, in an area of 3.39 km².

References

Freguesias of Amares